McCann's Steel Cut Irish Oatmeal is an Irish brand of oatmeal that is sold internationally.  It consists of steel-cut oats rather than rolled oats.

History
In 1800, John McCann built a mill at Beamond, County Meath, near Drogheda in Ireland.  In the 19th century, John McCann's Irish Oatmeal won several international prizes for the quality of its product and much of it was exported to the United States.  John McCann Jr. merged with R. R. Hill of Drogheda in 1896 and Beamond Mill closed in 1898 and the company moved to Merchant's Quay, Drogheda.  In the 20th century, McCann's increased exports of its oatmeal, notably to the United States and Canada.  In 1964, the then family-owned Odlums Group acquired the business and transferred production to its oatmeal mill in Sallins, County Kildare, which had been in operation since 1910. In 2008, Sturm Foods acquired the McCann's Irish Oatmeal brand, and were in 2010 themselves acquired by Treehouse Foods. In 2018 B&G Foods acquired the brand for $32 million.

Products
In addition to the traditional McCann's Steel Cut Irish Oatmeal, several other similar oat products carry the McCann's brand.  These include quick and instant oatmeals, oat bran, and bread and scone mixes.

Notes

External links
McCann's Irish Oatmeal official website

Food product brands
Breakfast cereals
Oats